András P Huhn (Szeged, 26 January 1947 – Szeged, 6 June 1985) was a Hungarian mathematician. Huhn's theorem on the representation of distributive semilattices is named after him.

References

External links
A Tribute to Andras Huhn by E. Tamás Schmidt

1947 births
1985 deaths
20th-century Hungarian mathematicians
Algebraists